(Japan > Miyazaki Prefecture > Minaminaka District)

 was a district located in Miyazaki Prefecture, Japan.

Until the day before the dissolution, the district contained two towns.
 Kitagō (北郷町; Kitagō-chō)
 Nangō (南郷町; Nangō-chō)

Timeline
 1884 - Minaminaka District was create when Naka District, Miyazaki was divided into Minaminaka and Kitanaka Districts.
 May 1, 1889 - Due to the municipal status enforcement, the town of Aburatsu (油津町) and 15 villages were formed within Minaminaka District.(1 town, 15 villages)
 January 1, 1900 - The village of Obi (飫肥村) was elevated to town status to become the town of Obi (飫肥町). (2 towns, 14 villages)
 October 1, 1926 - The village of Fukushima (福島村) was elevated to town status to become the town of Fukushima (福島町). (3 towns, 13 villages)
 December 1, 1940 - The village of Nangō (南郷村) was elevated to town status to become the town of Nangō. (4 towns, 12 villages)
 January 1, 1941 - The village of Hosoda (細田村) was elevated to town status to become the town of Hosoda (細田町). (5 towns, 11 villages)
 May 3, 1948 - The village of Agata (吾田村) was elevated to town status to become the town of Agata (吾田町). (6 towns, 10 villages)
 January 1, 1950 - The towns of Aburatsu, Obi and Agata, and the village of Tōgō (東郷村) were merged to create the city of Nichinan(日南市). (3 towns, 9 villages)
 January 1, 1951 - The town of Fukushima, and the village of Kitakata (北方村) were merged to create the town of Fukushima. (3 towns, 8 villages)
 November 3, 1954 - The town of Fukushima, and the villages of Ōtsuka (大束村), Ichiki (市木村), Honjō (本城村) and Toi (都井村) were merged to create the city of Kushima. (2 towns, 4 villages)
 February 11, 1955 - The town of Hosoda, and the village of Udo (鵜戸村) were merged into the city of Nichinan. (1 town, 3 villages)
 April 1, 1956: (1 town, 1 village)
 The village of Sakatani (酒谷村) was merged into the city of Nichinan.
 The village of Yowara (榎原村) was split into the town of Nangō and the city of Nichinan (respectively).
 January 1, 1959 - The village of Kitagō (北郷村) was elevated to town status to become the town of Kitagō. (2 towns)
 March 30, 2009 - The towns of Kitagō and Nangō were merged into the expanded city of Nichinan. Minaminaka District is dissolved.

See also
List of dissolved districts of Japan
Naka District, Hyūga
Kitanaka District, Miyazaki(Dissolved in 1896)
Naka District, Ibaraki
Naka District, Saitama
Naka District, Kagawa
Naka District, Fukuoka
Naka District, Tokushima
Naka District, Shizuoka
Naga District, Wakayama
Naka District, Shimane

Minaminaka District